Lal Chand may refer to:

Lal Chand (businessman) (1960–2020), businessman and a former member of Pakistan's Sindh Assembly
Lal Chand (athlete) (born 1928), an Indian long-distance runner
Lal Chand Malhi (born 1973), a Pakistani politician and member of National Assembly
Lal Chand Kataruchakk (born 1970 or 1971), an Indian politician
Lal Chand Mehra (1897–1980), an Indian character actor
Lal Chand Ukrani (born 1969), a Pakistani politician
Lal Chand Yamla Jatt (1914–1991), a Punjabi folk singer
Lal Chand Usta, designer of the Hawa Mahal (constructed 1799)

See also
Lalchand